Probable G-protein coupled receptor 37 is a protein that in humans is encoded by the GPR37 gene.

Interactions 

GPR37 has been shown to interact with HSPA1A and Parkin (ligase).
GPR37 is a receptor for prosaposin. It was previously thought to be a receptor for head activator, a neuropeptide found in the hydra, but early reports of head activator in mammals were never confirmed.

GPR37 signaling has been shown to modulate the migration of olfactory ensheathing cells (OECs) and gonadotropin-releasing hormone (GnRH) cells in mice.

References

Further reading 

 
 
 
 
 
 
 
 

G protein-coupled receptors